is a passenger railway station on the Minato Line in the city of Hitachinaka, Ibaraki, Japan, operated by the third-sector railway operator Hitachinaka Seaside Railway.

Lines

Station layout
The station is unstaffed and consists of a single side platform with a simple passenger waiting shelter. There is no station building.

History
The station opened on 28 November 1961 with the name . On 1 October 2019, it was renamed to its current name.

Passenger statistics
In fiscal 2011, the station was used by an average of 9 passengers daily.

Surrounding area
Koki Holdings Co., Ltd. Katsuta factory

See also
 List of railway stations in Japan

References

External links

 Hitachinaka Seaside Railway station information 

Railway stations in Ibaraki Prefecture
Railway stations in Japan opened in 1961
Hitachinaka, Ibaraki